Orphy Klempa (October 9, 1951 – October 11, 2021) was an American politician who served in the West Virginia House of Delegates from the 3rd district from 2006 to 2010 and in the West Virginia Senate from the 1st district from 2010 to 2012.

He died of bladder cancer on October 9, 2021, in Wheeling, West Virginia at age 70.

References

1951 births
2021 deaths
Democratic Party members of the West Virginia House of Delegates
Democratic Party West Virginia state senators
Politicians from Wheeling, West Virginia